Gloria Muñoz may refer to:
 Glòria Muñoz, Spanish painter and professor of painting
 Gloria Muñoz (actress), Spanish actress